Ô mon bel inconnu is a 1933 comédie musicale by Reynaldo Hahn with libretto by Sacha Guitry with whom he had earlier written Mozart).

References

Operas by Reynaldo Hahn
French-language operas
Opérettes
1933 operas
Operas